The House is a 2011 drama film written and directed by Zuzana Liová and starring Miroslav Krobot, Taťjana Medvecká and Judit Bárdos. The film won the main prize at the 2012 Finále Plzeň Film Festival. At the 2012 ceremony for the Sun in a Net Awards, the film won in the categories of Best Film and Best Actress, for the performance of Judit Bárdos. Taťjana Medvecká's performance in the film won her the accolade of Best Supporting Actress at the Czech Lion Awards as well as the Sun in a Net Awards.

Cast 
Miroslav Krobot as Imrich
Taťjana Medvecká as Viera
Judit Bárdos as Eva
Ester Geislerová as Hana
Marek Geišberg as Milan
Lucia Jašková as Jana
Marián Mitaš as Jakub
Attila Mokos

See also 
List of Czech films of the 2010s

References

External links 

2011 drama films
2011 films
Sun in a Net Awards winners (films)
Czech drama films
Slovak drama films